Tyrone Pandy (born 14 January 1986) is a Belizean professional footballer who currently plays for Belmopan Bandits Sporting Club and the Belize national football team as a defender.

References

1986 births
Belize international footballers
Belizean footballers
Living people
Premier League of Belize players
2011 Copa Centroamericana players
2013 Copa Centroamericana players
2013 CONCACAF Gold Cup players
2017 Copa Centroamericana players
Association football defenders
Belmopan Bandits players
Belize Defence Force FC players